Adrian Hoven (18 May 1922 – 28 April 1981) was an Austrian actor, producer and film director. He appeared in 100 films between 1947 and 1981. He was born in Wöllersdorf, Austria as Wilhelm Arpad Hofkirchner and died in Tegernsee, Germany.

Selected filmography

Actor

 Quax in Africa (1947) - Statist (uncredited)
 King of Hearts (1947)
 Tromba (1949) - Rudy Walheim, Sportstudent
 The Prisoner (1949) - Victor
 Der Dorfmonarch (1950) - Stefan Wimpflinger - der Sohn
 Who Is This That I Love? (1950) - Franz
 The Orplid Mystery (1950) - (uncredited)
 The White Hell of Pitz Palu (1950) - Peter Hofkirchner
 Dr. Holl (1951) - Tonio / Gardener
 Das seltsame Leben des Herrn Bruggs (1951) - Rupert - sein Sohn
 Maria Theresa (1951) - Leutnant Cordona
 Heimat, deine Sterne (1951) - Jagerloisl
 Captive Soul (1952)
 The White Adventure (1952) - Dr. Peter Wiedemann
 I Can't Marry Them All (1952) - Fredi
 Season in Salzburg (1952) - Heinz Doll
 I Lost My Heart in Heidelberg (1952) - Tony de Boers
 Carnival in White (1952) - Hans Brugger
 Hannerl: Ich tanze mit Dir in den Himmel hinein (1952) - Peter Bergmeister
 Marriage for One Night (1953) - Komma
 Stars Over Colombo (1953) - Gowaran
 Hooray, It's a Boy! (1953) - Dr. Kurt Wehling
 The Prisoner of the Maharaja (1954) - Gowaran
 My Sister and I (1954) - Rudi Becker
 The Big Star Parade (1954) - Peter Hofer
 Victoria in Dover (1954) - Prince Albert of Sachsen-Coburg
 Canaris (1954) - Capt. Althoff
 Secrets of the City (1955) - Gerhard Scholz
 Marriage Sanitarium (1955) - Stefan Seidlitz, Journalist
 Heimatland (1955) - Hans Bachinger
 Her First Date (1955) - Rolf
 As Long as You Live (1955) - Michael
 The Three from the Filling Station (1955) - Peter
 Lügen haben hübsche Beine (1956) - Arzt
 Pulverschnee nach Übersee (1956) - Bertl Unteraigner - Skilehrer
 Opera Ball (1956) - Richard Stelzer
 Like Once Lili Marleen (1956) - Franz Brugger
  (1956) - Paul Freitag
 Kaiserjäger (1956) - Oberleutnant Pacher
  ( Nature Girl and the Slaver, 1957) - Frank
 Scherben bringen Glück (1957) - Heinz Kersten, Komponist
 Die unentschuldigte Stunde (1957) - Dr. Hans Weiringk
 Vienna, City of My Dreams (1957) - Peter Lehnert, Musikprofessor
  (1958) - Bill Morton
 The Beautiful Legs of Sabrina (1958) - Mario Martino
 Rommel Calls Cairo (1959) - Capt. Johannes Eppler, alias Hussein Gafaar
 Arzt aus Leidenschaft (1959) - Dr. Manfred Wiegand
 I Aim at the Stars (1960) - Mischke
 Das Rätsel der grünen Spinne (1960) - Ted Wagner
 Foxhole in Cairo (1960) - John Eppler
 Island of the Amazons (1960) - Manuel
 The White Horse Inn (1960) - Dr. Siedler
 We Will Never Part (1960) - Guido Terni
 Ach Egon! (1961) - Dr. Kurt Wehling
 Am Sonntag will mein Süsser mit mir segeln gehn (1961) - Horst, der Scheidungsanwalt

 So liebt und küsst man in Tirol (1961) - Paul Kramer
 The Puzzle of the Red Orchid (1962) - Inspector Weston

 The Post Has Gone (1962) - Willy
 Don't Fool with Me (1963) - Modeschöpfer, Maler und Lehrer Raul Thorsten
 The Black Cobra (1963) - Peter Karner
 Mit besten Empfehlungen (1963) - Hans Neubauer, Lohnbuchhalter
 Allotria in Zell am See (1963) - Mark Fürberg
 Cave of the Living Dead (1964) - Insp. Frank Dorin
  (1964) - Tim Frazer
 Seven Hours of Gunfire (1965) - Wild Bill Hickok
 Jesse James' Kid (1965) - Allan
 The Murderer with the Silk Scarf (1966) - Waldemar Fürst (uncredited)
 To Skin a Spy (1966) - Kern
 Scorpions and Miniskirts (1967) - Paul Riviere
 Sünde mit Rabatt (1968) - Arzt
 Succubus (1968) - Ralf Drawes
 Im Schloß der blutigen Begierde (1968) - Georg V. Kassell (voice, uncredited)
 Sadist Erotica (1969) - Mr. Radeck
 Kiss Me Monster (1969) - Eric Vicas
 Mark of the Devil (1970) - Walter - the Nobleman
 The Long Swift Sword of Siegfried (1971) - Blonde and Bearded Showman with the Eggs (uncredited)
 La pente douce (1972) - Le mari
 Mark of the Devil Part II (1973) - Count Alexander von Salmenau (uncredited)
 Martha (1974, TV Movie) - Mr. Heyer, Martha's father
 Fox and His Friends (1975) - Wolf Thiess, Eugen's father
 Das Rückendekolleté (1975)
 Mother Küsters' Trip to Heaven (1975) - Redacteur-in-chief Linke (uncredited)
  (1975) - Finkenbauer
 Inside Out (1975) - Dr. Maar
 Shadow of Angels (1976) - Herr Müller, ihr Mann
 Satan's Brew (1976) - Arzt im Krankenhaus
 Petty Thieves (1977)
 Waldrausch (1977) - Angelo
  (1977) - Bettler
 Despair (1978) - Inspector Schelling
 Goetz von Berlichingen of the Iron Hand (1979) - Jäger Lerse
  (1979, TV film) - Josip
 Car-napping (1980) - Entrepreneur Benninger
 Lili Marleen (1981) - Ginsberg
  (1981) - Capone

Director or producer
In 1965 Hoven teamed up with wealthy Siemens stockholder Pier Andrea Caminneci (25 July 1941 – 30 December 2013) to form Aquila Film Enterprises.  The company allowed Hoven to not only produce and star in films he wanted to make, but also to direct some of their films.

 The Murderer with the Silk Scarf (1966)
 Scorpions and Miniskirts (1967 directed by Ramón Comas)
 Succubus (1968, directed by Jesús Franco)
  (1968)
  (1969, directed by Jesús Franco)
 Mark of the Devil (1970, directed by Michael Armstrong)
  (1971)
 Mark of the Devil Part II (1973)
  (1974)

References

External links

1922 births
1981 deaths
Austrian male film actors
Austrian film producers
Austrian film directors
German-language film directors
German people of Austrian descent
20th-century Austrian male actors